A  includes Historic Sites, Places of Scenic Beauty, and Natural Monuments registered (as opposed to designated, for which see Monuments of Japan) in accordance with the Law for the Protection of Cultural Properties 1950. As of 21 November 2014, there were ninety-three  registered Monuments, Makino Memorial Garden and the former residence of Okakura Tenshin being registered both as Historic Sites and Places of Scenic Beauty.

See also
 Monuments of Japan

References

External links
 Cultural Properties Database

Registered Monuments